is a junction passenger railway station in the city of Ichikawa, Chiba, Japan, operated by  East Japan Railway Company (JR East).

Lines 
Ichikawa Station is served by the Sōbu Line (Rapid) and all-stations Chūō-Sōbu Line services, and is located 15.4 kilometers from the western terminus of both lines at Tokyo Station.

Station layout
The station consists of two elevated island platforms serving four tracks, with additional passing tracks on either side of the Sōbu Line (Rapid) tracks for non-stop (limited express and commuter rapid) services. The station has a Midori no Madoguchi staffed ticket office. The "Shapo" shopping building adjoins the station.

Platforms

History 

The station opened on 20 July 1894. With the privatization of JNR on 1 April 1987, the station came under the control of JR East.

Passenger statistics
In fiscal 2019, the station was used by an average of 61,575 passengers daily (boarding passengers only). The passenger figures for previous years are as shown below.

Surrounding area

 Ichikawamama Station (on the Keisei Main Line, approximate 500 m away)
 Chiba University of Commerce
 Wayo Women's University
 Konodai Girls' School
 Edo River

Bus services
Bus stops are located on the north and south sides of the station, served by Keisei Bus. As of January 2015, the following bus services are available from Ichikawa Station.
NORTH EXIT
Keisei Bus

SOUTH EXIT
Keisei Transit Bus

See also
List of railway stations in Japan

References

External links 

JR East Ichikawa Station 

Railway stations in Chiba Prefecture
Sōbu Main Line
Chūō-Sōbu Line
Stations of East Japan Railway Company
Railway stations in Japan opened in 1894
Ichikawa, Chiba